Sylvester Joseph Hunter (b. at Bath, 13 September 1829; d. at Stonyhurst, 20 June 1896) was an English Jesuit and educator.

Life

His father, Joseph Hunter, was a Unitarian minister who was better known as an antiquarian writer and Shakespeare critic. In 1833 Joseph Hunter moved with his family from Bath to London to assume the function of Keeper of the Public Records, and in 1840 Sylvester Joseph Hunter entered St. Paul's School.

He received a scholarship at Trinity College, Cambridge, he entered the university in 1848. Graduating B.A. in 1852, he was placed eighth wrangler in the Mathematical Tripos for that year. Soon after this he entered Lincoln's Inn, London, as a law student.

In 1857 he was received into the Catholic Church by Canon Frederick Oakeley. Within eight years of his graduation at Cambridge he had published two legal text-books, The Suit in Equity and The Law of Trusteeships, which immediately attracted attention. His prospects at the chancery Bar were already assured when, in 1861, he decided to try his religious vocation in the Society of Jesus.

In 1861 he entered the English Novitiate, he there passed through the regular biennium of probation, attended lectures in philosophy at Stonyhurst Saint Mary's Hall, for one year, taught for two years at Stonyhurst College, and thence passed on to his theological studies at St. Beuno's College, where he was ordained priest in 1870.

He began to teach the higher classes at Stonyhurst. The University of London physics and mathematics requirements at that time were an obstacle to Stonyhurst boys whose time had been almost monopolized by their Latin and Greek studies. Hunter's efforts to deal with this situation resulted in an increased number of Stonyhurst students mentioned in the London Honours List, as well as in two books which he compiled to assist others in the same branch of teaching.

His influence was widened when, in 1875, he took up the training of Jesuit scholastics who were to teach in the colleges of the English Province. It was after ten years of this work that he was appointed rector of St. Beuno's, where he wrote the Outlines of Dogmatic Theology. Other spare moments were given to conducting the "Cases of Conscience" for the Diocese of Salford. He spent the last five years of his life at Stonyhurst where he began writing Short History of England but died before completing it.

Works

References

Letters and Notices (of the English province, S. J.).

1829 births
1896 deaths
19th-century English Jesuits
Alumni of Trinity College, Cambridge
Jesuit theologians
19th-century English Roman Catholic priests
English Roman Catholic theologians